The traditional Chinese calendar divides a year into 24 solar terms.Dàhán, Daikan, Daehan, or Đại hàn is the 24th solar term. It begins when the Sun reaches the celestial longitude of 300° and ends when it reaches the longitude of 315°. It more often refers in particular to the day when the Sun is exactly at the celestial longitude of 300°. In the Gregorian calendar, it usually begins around 20 January and ends around 4 February.

Date and time

References 

24
Winter time